Reception of the Grand Condé at Versailles (French: Réception du Grand Condé à Versailles), also known as Reception of the Grand Condé by Louis XIV (Réception du Grand Condé par Louis XIV), is a painting by Jean-Léon Gérôme, painted in 1878. It represents the reception of Louis II de Bourbon-Condé by Louis XIV, at the Palace of Versailles, at the foot of the Escalier des Ambassadeurs [fr], in 1674. The painting was acquired in 2004 by the Musée d'Orsay.

Analysis 
Following the mixed success of another of his paintings, Siècle d'Auguste : naissance de N. S. Jésus Christ (Exposition Universelle of 1855), Gérôme chose to focus on “small” history. In this painting he highlighted the comedy of power, through the belated allegiance of the prince to his king. The taste for reconstruction and the painter's precision are found in the representation of the rich court costumes, and in the reproduction of the monumental Escalier des Ambassadeurs de Versailles, destroyed more than a century earlier.

History
Gérôme's painting was acquired in 2004 by the Musée d'Orsay.

In 2014, the painting was loaned to the Museum of Fine Arts of Lyon as part of the exhibition L'invention du Passé. Histoires de cœur et d'épée 1802-1850 [fr].

References

External links

Musée d'Orsay website (French)

Palace of Versailles
1878 paintings
Paintings by Jean-Léon Gérôme
Louis XIV
Paintings in the collection of the Musée d'Orsay